Syed Nazrul Islam (1925 – 3 November 1975) was a Bangladeshi politician and a senior leader of the Awami League. During the Bangladesh Liberation War, he was declared as the Vice President of Bangladesh by the Provisional Government. He served as the Acting President in the absence of Sheikh Mujibur Rahman.

Early life
Syed Nazrul Islam was born in 1925, into a Bengali Muslim family of Syeds in the village of Bir Dampara, Jashodal Union in Kishoreganj (then Mymensingh District) of the Bengal Presidency. He obtained degrees in history and law from the University of Dhaka and was an active student political leader in the Muslim League. Syed captained his college's cricket and hockey teams and participated in the Pakistan movement. He entered the civil service of Pakistan in 1949 but resigned in 1951 to work as a professor of history at the Anandmohan College in Mymensingh, where he also practised law.

Political career

Syed Nazrul's political career began when he joined the Awami Muslim League and participated in the Language Movement in 1952, for which he was arrested by Pakistani police. He would rise to various provincial and central party leadership positions, becoming a close confidante of the party's leader Sheikh Mujib. He was jailed during the Six Point Demand movement. He was elected to the National Assembly of Pakistan in 1970, where he served briefly as deputy leader of the majority. Following the arrest of Mujib on 25 March 1971 by Pakistani forces, Syed escaped to Mujibnagar with other party leaders and proclaimed the independence of Bangladesh. Mujib was elected president of Bangladesh but Syed would serve as acting president, with Tajuddin Ahmed as prime minister. Syed played a key role in leading the nationalist cause, co-ordinating the Mukti Bahini guerrilla force and winning support from India and other nations.

After the independence of Bangladesh, Syed was appointed minister of industries, the deputy leader in parliament and a member of the constitution committee. When Mujib banned other political parties and assumed sweeping powers as president in 1975, Syed was appointed vice-Chairman of the BAKSAL, the renamed Awami League.

Personal life
Islam married Syeda Nafisa Islam and had 4 sons and 2 daughters. His four sons were Sayed Ashraful Islam, Syed Manzurul Islam Manju, Syed Shariful Islam and Syed Shafayetul Islam, and his two daughters were  Syeda Zakia Noor Lipi ad Syeda Rafia Noor.

Death
Following the assassination of Sheikh Mujibur Rahman on 15 August 1975 Syed fled underground with other Mujib loyalists such as Tajuddin Ahmad, A. H. M. Qamaruzzaman and Muhammad Mansur Ali, but was ultimately arrested by the regime of the new president Khondaker Mostaq Ahmad. The four leaders were imprisoned in the Dhaka Central Jail and assassinated on 3 November under controversial and mysterious circumstances known as the Jail Killing. This day is commemorated every year in Bangladesh Jail Killing Day. Captain (relieved) Kismat Hashem was sentenced to life in prison for the killings. He died due to cardiac arrest in Canada.

Legacy
Government-run Shahid Syed Nazrul Islam Medical College in Kishoreganj is named in his memory. Sayed Ashraful Islam is son of Sayed Nazrul Islam.

References

1925 births
1975 deaths
Bangladeshi Muslims
Awami League politicians
Vice presidents of Bangladesh
Bangladesh Liberation War
Bangladeshi people who died in prison custody
University of Dhaka alumni
Pakistani politicians
Prisoners who died in Bangladeshi detention
Recipients of the Independence Day Award
Industries ministers of Bangladesh
Bangladeshi people of Arab descent
20th-century Bengalis
Bangladesh Krishak Sramik Awami League executive committee members
Bangladesh Krishak Sramik Awami League central committee members